Clifford Austin (born March 2, 1960) is an American former professional football running back who played in the National Football League (NFL) for five seasons for the New Orleans Saints, Atlanta Falcons and Tampa Bay Buccaneers. Austin played in a total of 58 career games while making three starts.

Austin was also a star running back on Clemson’s 1981 Championship team.

References

Living people
1960 births
New Orleans Saints players
Atlanta Falcons players
Tampa Bay Buccaneers players
American football running backs
Clemson Tigers football players